The president of the Gaelic Athletic Association is the head of the Gaelic Athletic Association (GAA).

The president holds office for three years. The role of president has existed since the foundation of the GAA. The president of the GAA is one of the leading figures in civil society in Ireland, as the association has around one million members and is present in every parish in the country. The role of president involves representing the GAA in Ireland and across the world. Former presidents of the GAA have a key role within the GAA, sitting on the motions committee which rules if motions to the annual Congress are in order. They also have become known for other roles such as Seán Kelly, who is now an MEP.

The president travels across Ireland and the world to promote the organisation and attend games; former President Nickey Brennan travelled 160,000 miles in Ireland alone during his three years as president, and visited Great Britain, Europe, North America, Asia, Australia and the Middle East on several occasions, meeting dignitaries such as New York City mayor Michael Bloomberg along the way.

The current president is Larry McCarthy, installed at the 2021 GAA Congress.
Jarlath Burns, the former Armagh captain and TV Gaelic Football analyst is the new President-elect. Jarlath from Silverbridge in South Armagh is headteacher at St Paul's Bessbrook. He is a fluent Irish speaker and formerly worked on the Eames Bradley project which aimed to settle legacy issues relating to victims in Northern Ireland. Burns will take office as GAA president in 2024.

Selection

The president is elected at Annual Congress. He then serves as -elect for one year.

History

In 1981, John Kerry O'Donnell became the first overseas member of the GAA to run for president.

In 2020, Larry McCarthy became the first overseas member of the GAA to be elected as president.

List of presidents of the Gaelic Athletic Association

Births and deaths
The following presidents (listed chronologically from their term in office) are missing dates of birth and/or death in the list above: Edward Bennet (birth), Peter Kelly (birth), Frank Dineen (birth), Michael Deering (birth), James Nowlan (birth), Patrick Breen (birth/death), Seán Ryan (birth), Seán McCarthy (birth), Bob O'Keeffe (death), Pádraig MacNamee (birth/death), Séamus Gardiner (birth), Dan O'Rourke (birth), Aodh Ó Broin (birth), Donal Keenan (birth), Paddy McFlynn (birth), Peter Quinn (birth), Joe McDonagh (birth), Seán McCague (birth), Christy Cooney (birth), Liam O'Neill (birth), Aogán Ó Fearghail (birth), John Horan (birth), Larry McCarthy (birth).

President's Awards
Seán Kelly introduced the President's Awards.

They are awarded annually.

Player–presidents
Donal Keenan, Con Murphy, Paddy Buggy and Nickey Brennan all won All-Ireland medals as players before becoming president.

John Dowling was with the Tullamore club as a dual player, but at inter-county level his involvement was more as a referee, officiating in five All-Ireland finals.

Peter Quinn played for Teemore in Fermanagh, winning a Junior Football Championship. However, his only involvement with the Fermanagh seniors was in the Dr Lagan Cup and some challenge matches; he was never even included in a championship panel.

Seán McCague played junior club football for most of the time but at inter-county level he was a manager.

Jack Boothman played for the Blessington club.

Liam O'Neill played with the Trumera club at junior level, though featured at senior level on hurling teams while studying at St Pat's and UCD.

Aogán Ó Fearghail played locally for 12 years but won no championship games.

John Horan played for Na Fianna in his late twenties.

The highlight of Larry McCarthy's playing career was winning the 1977–78 All-Ireland Senior Club Football Championship with Thomond College.

Statistics
? was the oldest president to enter office, aged ?.
? was the oldest president to leave office, aged ?.
Seán Ryan was the youngest president to enter office, aged ?.
? was the youngest president to leave office, aged ?.
?, who died in office, had the shortest presidency of ? days.
?, who resigned, served for ? days.
Maurice Davin uniquely served for two terms.
James Nowlan is the longest-serving.
Pat Fanning was the former president to have survived the longest after serving.
Michael Deering was the only president to die in office.
Only twice have there been consecutive presidents from the same province: Joseph Stuart (1958) and Aodh Ó Broin (1961) of Leinster and Séamus Ó Riain (1967) and Pat Fanning (1970) of Munster.
Leinster had three consecutive presidents from different counties (Kilkenny, Dublin, Wexford) between 1901 and 1926.
Munster then had three consecutive presidents from different counties (Limerick, Tipperary, Cork) between 1926 and 1935.
Five of the seven Ulster presidents came from north of the border. The other two were Seán McCague (Monaghan) and Aogán Ó Fearghail (Cavan).

By county
The following counties have had multiple presidents:

By province

References